The Delaware Valley Association of Rail Passengers (DVARP) is an all-volunteer, mass transit advocacy group in the Greater Philadelphia, Pennsylvania Metropolitan Area. DVARP was founded in 1972, and has engaged in rail and transit advocacy since that time.  The group was officially incorporated as a 501(c)(3) non-profit organization in 1996.

References

External links

Organizations based in Philadelphia
Rail advocacy organizations in the United States